Nature is the 24th studio album by Australian musician Paul Kelly, released on 12 October 2018.

At the ARIA Music Awards of 2019, the album won ARIA Award for Best Adult Contemporary Album.

Background and recording
In August 2017, Paul Kelly released his 23rd studio album Life Is Fine. The album was a success, giving Kelly his first ever ARIA number-one album, and winning four ARIA Music Awards at the ARIA Music Awards of 2017.

With most of the songs written over the course of several years and dating back to the recording sessions for albums such as The Merri Soul Sessions, Seven Sonnets & a Song and Life Is Fine, Nature focuses on human nature's small place in the natural world. Kelly said: "I didn't realise I had the makings of another album until I put the songs in a folder and saw the titles staring me in the face. Sometimes you don't know what you're doing until you look back. I think of Nature as a companion piece to Life Is Fine, itself full of moons, rain, rocks, rivers, seas, smells and lovers."

"A bastard like me" was written to honour Aboriginal activist Charlie Perkins. The title of the song is taken from Perkins' autobiography, and the video features footage from his life.

Reception

Mikey Cahill from the Herald Sun described how Kelly in Nature is "staying relevant and relishing the opportunity to pump out another 12 mostly great songs." PopMatters Steve Horowitz opined, "[he] put five classic poems by major writers on his latest album of a dozen songs... While it's wonderful that Kelly brings these words to life for non-poetry readers to enjoy, there is something tawdry about the whole affair."

Brian Parker from Your Music Radar indicated, "Conceptually this album works, where there is something otherworldly about it. It seems to question the existence of nature and the forces of nature, the human soul, the cycle of birth and death, and of the beauty of being alive, in love, but also the gravity of the inevitable."

Track listing
All music written by Paul Kelly and Bill McDonald.

Personnel
 Paul Kelly – lead and backing vocals, acoustic and electric guitars
 Bill McDonald – bass guitar, arrangement
 Cameron Bruce – piano, keyboards, organ, backing vocals
 Ashley Naylor – lead guitar, backing vocals
 Dan Kelly - rhythm guitar, backing vocals
 Peter Luscombe – drums, percussion, backing vocals
 Kate Miller-Heidke – backing vocals on "Bound to Follow (Aisling Song)"
 Vika Bull – backing vocals
 Linda Bull – backing vocals
 Madeleine Kelly – backing vocals
 Memphis Kelly – backing vocals
 Alice Keath – backing vocals

Charts

See also
 List of number-one albums of 2018 (Australia)

References

2018 albums
Paul Kelly (Australian musician) albums
ARIA Award-winning albums